Mells Village Hall in Mells, Somerset, England was built in the 14th century as a tithe barn and now serves as the village hall. It is a Grade II* listed building.

History

The hall was built as a tithe barn, belonging to Glastonbury Abbey, in the 14th century. A new roof was constructed and the building revised around 1500. A new ceiling was installed in the 20th century.

The hall is used as a village hall run by a charitable committee, following a lease and trust deed signed in 1964. Toilets and a kitchen have been installed which were refurbished in 2012.

Architecture

The six-bay stone building has a tiled cruck roof. Buttresses are used to support the walls.

References

External links
 Hall web site

Grade II* listed buildings in Mendip District
Tithe barns in Europe
Buildings and structures completed in the 14th century